In mathematics, the Mellin inversion formula (named after Hjalmar Mellin) tells us conditions under
which the inverse Mellin transform, or equivalently the inverse two-sided Laplace transform, are defined and recover the transformed function.

Method 

If  is analytic in the strip ,

we have that

Conversely, suppose  is piecewise continuous on the positive real numbers, taking a value halfway between the limit values at any jump discontinuities, and suppose the integral

is absolutely convergent when . Then  is recoverable via the inverse Mellin transform from its Mellin transform . These results can be obtained by relating the Mellin transform to the Fourier transform by a change of variables and then applying an appropriate version of the Fourier inversion theorem.

Boundedness condition 

The boundedness condition on  can be strengthen if 
 is continuous.

On the other hand, if we are willing to accept an original  which is a 
generalized function, we may relax the boundedness condition on 
 to
simply make it of polynomial growth in any closed strip contained in the open strip .

We may also define a Banach space version of this theorem. If we call by
 the weighted Lp space of complex valued functions  on the positive reals such that

Here functions, identical everywhere except on a set of measure zero, are identified.

Since the two-sided Laplace transform can be defined as

these theorems can be immediately applied to it also.

See also
Mellin transform
Nachbin's theorem

References

External links
 Tables of Integral Transforms at EqWorld: The World of Mathematical Equations.

Integral transforms
Theorems in complex analysis
Laplace transforms